"Gūzen no Kakuritsu" is the debut single by the band Girl Next Door and it was released on September 3, 2008. It is the theme song for the Japanese show CDTV while the B-side Breath was used as the ending theme for Uwasa no Tokyo Magazine.

CD track listing 
 Gūzen no Kakuritsu (偶然の確率)
 Breath
 Red Ribbon ~Unmei no Hito~ (~運命の人~)
 Gūzen no Kakuritsu (ice cream mix)
 Gūzen no Kakuritsu (Instrumental)
 Breath (Instrumental)

DVD track listing 
 Gūzen no Kakuritsu (Music Video: Special Version)

Charts

Oricon sales chart

Billboard Japan

References

External links 
  

2008 debut singles
Girl Next Door (band) songs
2008 songs
Avex Trax singles
Songs written by Daisuke Suzuki (musician)